Soroti Regional Referral Hospital, commonly known as Soroti Hospital is a hospital in the city of Soroti, in Soroti District, in Eastern Uganda. It is the referral hospital for the districts of Amuria, Bukedea, Kaberamaido, Kapelebyong, Katakwi,  Kumi, Ngora, Serere and Soroti.

Location

The coordinates of Soroti Regional Referral Hospital are:1°42'58.0"N, 33°36'47.0"E (Latitude:1.716111; Longitude:33.613056).

Overview
Soroti Hospital is a public hospital, funded by the Uganda Ministry of Health and general care in the hospital is free. It is one of the 13 Regional Referral Hospitals in Uganda. The hospital is designated as one of the 15 Internship Hospitals in Uganda where graduates of Ugandan medical schools can serve one year of internship under the supervision of qualified specialists and consultants. The bed capacity of Soroti Hospital was quoted as 250, as of October 2000. In October 2020, the hospital's bed capacity was quoted at 274.

Other considerations
The hospital was established in the mid 1920s as a treatment centre for syphilis. It was elevated to a district hospital in 1978 and it became a referral hospital in 1996.

Soroti Regional Referral Hospital is governed by a 19-person board, chaired by Dr Charles Vincent Ojoome, effective August 2019. Dr Michael Mwanga the hospital's executive director is the secretary to the hospital's board.

See also

References

External links
  Soroti District Internet Portal
  Soroti Regional Referral Hospital Lacks Cold Rooms

Hospitals in Uganda
Soroti District
Soroti
Teso sub-region
Eastern Region, Uganda
Teaching hospitals in Uganda